The men's canoe slalom C-1 competition at the 2012 Olympic Games in London took place between 29 and 31 July at the Lee Valley White Water Centre. Seventeen canoeists from 17 nations competed.

The gold medal was won by Tony Estanguet of France.

Competition format
In the heats, each competitor had two runs; the 12 athletes with the best time qualified for the semi-finals. Each semi-final consisted of one run each and the best eight competitors qualified for the final. The final consisted of one additional run and the medal placings were decided on the score from that run.

Schedule 
All times are British Summer Time (UTC+01:00)

C-1 slalom men

References

Men's slalom C-1
Men's events at the 2012 Summer Olympics